Francesco Antonio Giorgioli (1655–1725) was a Swiss painter.

Born in Meride in the Canton of Ticino in Switzerland.  He was a painter of Baroque frescos.

References

This article was initially translated from the German Wikipedia.

17th-century Swiss painters
Swiss male painters
18th-century Swiss painters
18th-century Swiss male artists
1655 births
1725 deaths